The Sehol X8 is a mid-size crossover SUV produced by JAC Motors. Originally it is called the JAC Jiayue X8, the crossover SUV was moved under the Sol brand which was later renamed to Sehol.

Overview

The X8 was announced in May 2020. It was officially presented at the Chengdu Auto Show in July 2020. The five, six or seven-seater vehicle has been sold on the Chinese domestic market since October 2020.

The X8 is powered by a turbocharged 1.5-liter four-cylinder engine with 135 kW (184 hp). It has a 6-speed manual transmission as standard, a 6-speed dual clutch transmission is available at an additional cost.

References

External links
Official website

Jiayue X8
Crossover sport utility vehicles
Mid-size sport utility vehicles
Front-wheel-drive vehicles
Cars introduced in 2020